Eugnosta proanoa is a species of moth of the family Tortricidae. It is found in Ecuador (Morona-Santiago Province).

References

Moths described in 2001
Eugnosta